Absor Fauzi (born August 11, 1988, in Bandung) is an Indonesian professional footballer who currently plays for Persik Kediri in the Liga 2.

Club career statistics

References

External links

1987 births
Association football defenders
Living people
Indonesian footballers
Liga 1 (Indonesia) players
Persiba Balikpapan players
Sportspeople from Bandung